Wailua River yellow loosestrife is a common name for two very rare species of Hawaiian plants and may refer to:

Lysimachia filifolia
Lysimachia iniki